Special Ops is an Indian Hindi-language action espionage thriller web series for Hotstar Specials created and directed by Neeraj Pandey, with Shivam Nair serving the credits for co-direction. Pandey also produced the series under his Friday Storytellers, a division of his production house, for providing content to the digital medium. It stars Kay Kay Menon as Himmat Singh, a member of Research and Analysis Wing, forms a team of five agents, in order to track down a person, who is the mastermind of the terror attacks which took place in India.

Neeraj Pandey eventually conceptualised the idea of the script in late 2010, with the series eventually scheduled to be aired on Star Plus, which however did not materialise. He later revived the project in August 2019. Shooting of the series took place in India, and some scenes were filmed in Turkey, Jordan, United Arab Emirates and Azerbaijan. The cinematography and editing were handled by Sudheer Palsane, Arvind Singh and Praveen Kathikuloth, whereas Advait Nemlekar composed the background score.

Special OPS was released through Hotstar on 17 March 2020. The series received positive response from critics, praising the performances of the cast members, storyline, direction and technical aspects. It also received eight nominations at the inaugural Filmfare OTT Awards, winning three of them. Pandey had transformed the series into a franchise, with the second instalment Special Ops 1.5: The Himmat Story released on 12 November 2021.

Premise 
The series follows Himmat Singh (Menon) of the Research and Analysis Wing who finds similar patterns in terrorist attacks and is convinced a single person is behind all the attacks. His task force team of five agents living in various parts of the world aim to catch the mastermind.

Cast 
 Kay Kay Menon as Himmat Singh
 Karan Tacker as Farooq Ali/Amjad Sharif/Rashid Malik
 Vinay Pathak as Abbas Sheikh
 Vipul Gupta as Balakrishna "Bala" Reddy
 Sajjad Delafrooz as Hafiz Ali
 Muzamil Ibrahim as Avinash
 Saiyami Kher as Juhi Kashyap
 Meher Vij as Ruhani Khan
 Gautami Kapoor as Saroj 
 Rajat Kaul as Ismail Hassan
 Sana Khan as Sonia
 Mir Sarwar as Hamid (cameo appearance)
 S. M. Zaheer as Noor Baksh
 K. C. Shankar as Wasim Karachiwala/Firdaus Sheikh/Jalaal Mansoor
 Parmeet Sethi as Naresh Chadda
 Rohit Tannan as Moderator for Indo-Pak Meet
 Kali Prasad Mukherjee as Mr. D.K. Bannerjee
 Divya Dutta as Sadia Qureshi
 Sharad Kelkar as IB officer Surya Kumar (extended cameo appearance in episode 8 and some parts of episode 7)
 Devas Dixit as Lallan
 Pawan Chopra as Chintan
 Bikramjeet Kanwarpal as G.P. Mathur
 Rajendra Chawla as llliyaas Hassan
 Alok Pandey as Pappu Haramzada
 Pakkhi Gupta as Farah Qureshi
 Tanaya Sachdeva as Aditi Rao, daughter of Indian ambassador in Turkey
 Sohaila Kapur as Sujata Thapar
 Bijendra Gupta as Habib Naik
 Rahul Vora as Zaheer Raza
 Abhiroy Singh as Mansoor
 Anuj Sharma as Chaudhary
 Revathi Pillai as Pari
 Vaansh Goswami as Mohammad

Episodes 
The episode were titled, as a tribute, after various Bollywood films by series creator Neeraj Pandey who served as an episode director on an alternating pattern with co-director Shivam Nair.<ref name=":1">{{Cite web|last=IANS|title=Neeraj Pandeys special tribute to Bollywood|url=https://www.outlookindia.com/newsscroll/neeraj-pandeys-special-tribute-to-bollywood/1772819|url-status=live|access-date=2021-06-18|website=Outlook India}}</ref> The films referenced include Kaagaz Ke Phool (1959), Guide (1965), Mughal-e-Azam (1960), Hum Kisise Kum Naheen (1977), Chaudhvin Ka Chand (1960), Qurbani (1980), Shatranj ke Khiladi (1977) and Sholay (1975).

 Production 

 Development 
On 15 January 2019, the streaming platform Hotstar, announced its foray to original content production exclusively for the service, with Star India, the parent company of Hotstar, tied up with 15 Indian filmmakers for creating the shows for its label called Hotstar Specials. Pandey had started a new division Friday Storytellers, a subsidiary of his production house Friday Filmworks, for digital content providers, in which the series is produced.

The series is developed as an eight-hour story which is inspired by nineteen years worth events of national significance by Pandey along with Deepak Kingrani and Benazir Ali Fida. Shivam Nair was served as the co-director. He initially pitched the idea of the series in 2010, with Star India's head Gaurav Bannerjee, offering to premiere the show on Star Plus, but failed to materialise later. The project was eventually announced with Kay Kay Menon being offered to play the protagonist, on 6 August 2019, and the rest of the cast and crew members were finalised in the same month.

 Filming 
The principal photography of the series was kickstarted in mid-August 2019. Shivam Nair took charge of helming the major portions of the show taking place in India, and Pandey was directing the rest of the sequences. The show has recreated Parliament of India for filming 2001 Indian Parliament attack portions which were dealt for the first time in film history. Apart from India the show is filmed in Turkey, Jordan, United Arab Emirates and Azerbaijan. Pandey eventually stated that the shooting of the series in Delhi was more expensive, as the team needed to build sets and also use visual effects, as the story needs heavy mounting, and hence filmed in international locations.

 Release 
A promotional video featuring between the scenes footage of filming was released on 23 February 2020. The teaser poster was released on 25 February 2020, followed by the trailer of the series, which was dropped on the same day at a press conference held in Mumbai, attended by the cast and crew. On 1 March 2020, the makers announced that the series will be premiered on Hotstar on 17 March 2020, where it will be made accessible for viewers who enabled the VIP subscription method, in the streaming platform. On 15 March 2020, the second trailer of the series was released, which confirmed the release on the said date. However, Hotstar eventually released the first episode, earlier ahead of the scheduled date, on 16 March 2020, followed by the other consecutive episodes. The series was premiered in seven Indian languages – Tamil, Telugu, Bengali, Malayalam, Marathi and Kannada, along with its Hindi original version on the said date.

 Reception 

 Critical response Special OPS received mostly positive response from critics. Rohan Naahar of Hindustan Times stated "Neeraj Pandey and Kay Kay Menon deliver the first Hotstar original series almost worth the self-isolation." Sana Farzeen of The Indian Express stated "With some impressive performances and a compelling tale, Special Ops deserves a watch". Saibal Chatterjee of NDTV gave three out of five stars to the show stating "Special Ops, is a sprawling espionage actioner that takes its own sweet time to glide towards two suspenseful climactic build-ups." Archika Khurana of The Times of India too gave three out of five and stated "Special Ops' could have been a winner all together if it was more focussed. Still, this setup of spies is better than some of its counterparts, and is binge worthy too."

Stutee Ghosh of The Quint stated "Special Ops is uneven in its pace and falters in between but it’s also a proof of Neeraj Pandey’s skill that despite these flaws he has created a series that has enough drama to keep us hooked", and gave three out of five stars. Divyanshi Sharma of India Today, gave a mixed review stating "Special Ops has some stellar performances, which was put down by, forced slow-motion scenes, predictable twists, absence of logic and poorly executed story." Nandini Ramanath of Scroll.in opined "Special Ops lands on the better side of Bard of Blood, but doesn’t match the entertainment value of The Family Man [...] While the Parliament attack is well executed, the hand-to-hand combat scenes are unmistakably choreographed."

Avinash Ramachandran of The New Indian Express commented "Despite the supporting cast being underwritten, a few setbacks in the pacing, and the oh-so-convenient twists, the show gets a lot right". Firstpost chief critic Pratishruti Ganguly gave two out of five and stated "Perhaps it would have fared better for Special Ops to do away with the frills and focus on the titular special operation right from the get ... However, it could well be a binge-worthy series in the times of self-quarantine."

 Accolades 

 Future 

In a live chat session on Instagram, with Kay Kay Menon, Karan Tacker and Neeraj Pandey in May 2020, the director hinted of the second season of the series which is yet to be conceptualised. Although an official announcement of the second season was made in April, Pandey hinted that the series will be "bigger than that of the first season".

In January 2021, Pandey announced that the works on the second season will be completed, before starting the production of Ajay Devgn's Chanakya. He eventually converted the series into a franchise and on 22 January 2021, the makers announced the second instalment in the franchise titled Special Ops 1.5: The Himmat Story''. The series which revolves around the backstory of Himmat Singh (Menon) as a raw agent, is a prequel to the first season. The series consisted of four episodes with a runtime of nearly one-hour and was premiered on Disney+ Hotstar on 12 November 2021.

See also 

 Srikant Tiwari (The Family Man), an Indian fictional secret agent character which appeared in The Family Man (Indian TV series), a year before Special Ops

References

External links 
 
Special Ops at Disney+ Hotstar

Hindi-language Disney+ Hotstar original programming
2020 Indian television series debuts
Indian thriller television series
Indian action television series
Hindi-language television shows
Research and Analysis Wing in fiction
India–Pakistan relations in popular culture
Terrorism in television